Florida's 31st House District elects one member of the Florida House of Representatives. Its current representative is Republican Jennifer Sullivan.

Representatives from 1967 to the present

See also 
 List of members of the Florida House of Representatives from Brevard County, Florida

References

31
Brevard County, Florida